The Achaei were an ancient people of Scythia, mentioned by Strabo (11.2, together with the Zygoi, Heniochi, and Cercetae and  Macropogones) and by Pliny (4.26.2). Pliny mentions a Portus Achaeorum at the mouths of the Danube.
The name has been interpreted to mean "river dwellers", from an Indo-European word for "water" (Latin aqua, Old High German aha; Wissowa, Pauly's Real-Encyclopadie s. v. Achaei)

References
 

Ancient peoples
Scythia
Iranian_nomads